Érika Salvatierra Durán (born 3 May 1990) is a Bolivian footballer who plays as a defender for Spanish Primera Nacional club Águilas FC and the Bolivia women's national team.

Club career
Salvatierra played for Universidad in her native Bolivia. She later moved to Spain.

International career
Salvatierra has capped for Bolivia during the 2006 South American Women's Football Championship. She has also appeared at the 2008 South American U-20 Women's Championship.

International goals
Scores and results are list Bolivia's goal tally first

Honors and awards

Clubs
Universidad
Bolivian women's football championship: 2012

Personal life
Salvatierra is also a psychologist, a music therapist and a sports psychologist.

References

1990 births
Living people
Sportspeople from Santa Cruz de la Sierra
Bolivian women's footballers
Women's association football defenders
Bolivia women's international footballers
Bolivian expatriate footballers
Bolivian expatriate sportspeople in Spain
Expatriate women's footballers in Spain